Søsterbekk Station is a railway station in the municipality of Narvik in Nordland county, Norway.  It is located along the Ofotbanen railway line, between Katterat Station and Bjørnfjell Station. It has direct railway connections to Narvik, Kiruna, and Luleå. 

The station was originally opened in 1955, but it was moved in 1988 when a new route was built to circumvent the old and outdated Norddal Bridge that had been built in 1902. There is no road to the station.

References

Narvik
Railway stations on the Ofoten Line
Railway stations in Narvik
Railway stations opened in 1902
1902 establishments in Norway